Warsaw Municipal Airport  is a public use airport located two miles (3 km) north of the central business district of Warsaw, a city in Kosciusko County, Indiana, United States. It is owned by the Warsaw Board of Aviation Commissioners.

Although most U.S. airports use the same three-letter location identifier for the FAA and IATA, Warsaw Municipal Airport is assigned ASW by the FAA but has no designation from the IATA (which assigned ASW to Aswan International Airport in Aswan, Egypt).

Facilities and aircraft 

For the 12-month period ending December 31, 2018, the airport had 13,373 aircraft operations, an average of 37 per day: 95% general aviation and 5% air taxi. In February 2022, there were 41 aircraft based at this airport: 37 single-engine, 1 multi-engine and 3 jet.

References

External links 
 

Airports in Indiana
Transportation buildings and structures in Kosciusko County, Indiana